The 1878 Melbourne Cup was a two-mile handicap horse race which took place on Tuesday, 5 November 1878.

This year was the eighteenth running of the Melbourne Cup. It was the fifth time a horse trained by Etienne L. de Mestre won. The race was won by Calamia and the 1877 cup winner Chester fell during the race.

This is the list of placegetters for the 1878 Melbourne Cup.

See also

 Melbourne Cup
 List of Melbourne Cup winners
 Victoria Racing Club

References

External links
1878 Melbourne Cup footyjumpers.com

1878
Melbourne Cup
Melbourne Cup
19th century in Melbourne
1870s in Melbourne